Shin Hi-sup (born July 29, 1964 in South Korea ) is a retired South Korean boxer.

Professional career

In 1980 he successfully started his professional career. On August 2, 1986, he boxed against Jung Bi-won for the IBF world title and won by technical knockout in round 15. However, he lost this belt in his second title defense to Dodie Boy Peñalosa in February of the following year by knockout. After this defeat he retired from boxing.

See also
List of flyweight boxing champions

External links

1964 births
Living people
South Korean male boxers
Flyweight boxers
World flyweight boxing champions
International Boxing Federation champions
Sportspeople from Seoul